Estadio San Juan del Bicentenario is a stadium in Pocito Department of San Juan Province, Argentina. It is used mostly for football events, hosting the home matches of San Martín de San Juan, Sportivo Desamparados, and other local clubs. The stadium also served as venue for the 2011 Copa América. The stadium was designed with a capacity of 25,286 spectators and required an investment of AR$86 million. The stadium has also hosted rugby union and field hockey matches.

History 
Works started in March 2009, with a total of 500 workers employed. Works extended for 24 months. The stadium was supposed to be inaugurated in May, 2010, to commemorate the 200 years of the May Revolution. Delays, however, have meant that the stadium was inaugurated on March 16, 2011, with the Argentina vs Venezuela friendly match which Argentina won by a score of 4–1, in front of an attendance of 30,000. That year, the stadium hosted group stage and quarter-final matches in the 2011 Copa América.

In March 2013, an additional field was also inaugurated at a cost of AR$ 9 million. The field has similar measures (105 x 68 m) and six lighting towers which allow it to host matches at night.

In 2012, Estadio del Bicentenario hosted the first final of the relaunched Copa Argentina, where Boca Juniors beat Racing 21. One year later, the stadium was one of the two venues of the 2013 South American Youth Championship and hosted Group B in the first stage.

In 2018, it again hosted the Argentina national team, this time for a 2018 FIFA World Cup qualification (CONMEBOL) match against Colombia, which Argentina won 3–0.

Sporting events

2011 Copa América

FIFA World Cup qualification

Rugby union

References

External links

 Sedes: Estadio San Juan del Bicentenario at Copa Argentina.org
 View on Google Maps

b
Copa América stadiums
Sport in San Juan Province, Argentina
2011 establishments in Argentina
Buildings and structures in San Juan, Argentina